Dave Ward may refer to:

Dave Ward (reporter) (born 1939), Houston news anchor
Dave Ward (rugby union) (born 1985), English rugby union player
Dave Ward (trade unionist), leader of the Communication Workers Union
Dave Ward (voice actor), Scottish-Canadian voice actor

See also
David Ward (disambiguation)